Ebenezer Sunder Singh (born 16 April 1967) is an Indian-American visual artist based in Brooklyn, New York. Singh works primarily as a painter, sculptor, photographer and filmmaker.

Early life and education
Singh was born in the temple town of Tirunelveli, Tamil Nadu in India. His formative years were influenced by the twin heritages of his hometown, which houses both Christian cathedrals and the Hindu Nellaiappar Temple. Singh went on to graduate from Government College of Fine Arts, Chennai, where he had begun to show his work in state-level exhibitions. He studied under A. P. Santhanaraj and L. Mumusamy. Following his move to the United States, Singh received his MFA in Visual Art from the Lesley University College of Art and Design, where he studied photography and video art under Julia Scher and Judith Barry.

Career
Singh's early career began at Cholamandal Artists' Village, Chennai, the largest artists' commune in India. His primary visual influences were initially based on Dravidian temple art and its mythological capacity for figuration, but he soon imbued this with elements of the Italian Transavantgarde movement following his exposure to the works of Naples-born painter Francesco Clemente. Singh debuted his paintings and sculptures at a 1996 solo exhibition titled The Hollow Men, The Stuffed Men at Easel Art Gallery.
Singh was then chosen to represent India in 1998 at the International Artists Camp held in Sri Lanka, where he worked and exhibited his works alongside German painter Thomas Scheibitz. The following year, Singh received the Charles Wallace Grant and traveled to England, where his illustration and printmaking works were exhibited at Kingston University in a show titled Neti...Neti... His work saw him drawing on metaphysical themes of redemptive resurrection and transcendentalism. 

In the Indian art sphere, Pundole Art Gallery in Mumbai showcased Singh's figurative works, as did Anant Art Gallery, Threshold Art Gallery and New Delhi's contemporary art hub Palette Art Gallery. 
In 2001, he exhibited his paintings and sculptures at the Museum of Asian Art (Museum für Asiatische Kunst) in Berlin, Germany in a series titled Inspirationen. The Museum of Asian Art later acquired twelve of Singh's paintings and sculptures for its permanent collection, as did the National Gallery of Modern Art in New Delhi, India, which collected three of his paintings. Singh was awarded the Artist's Fulbright Fellowship as part of the Fulbright Program and researched on the cathartic symbolism of religious iconography in the context of the east-west subaltern dialogue. For the next decade, Singh continued to exhibit his contemporary figurative works in venues like Barcelona, Budapest, Munich, and Mumbai with self-portrait photography, canvases and sequined fiberglass sculptures. 

Singh's photographic self-portraits were chosen to be a part of a traveling exhibition titled Self and the Other - Portraiture in Contemporary Indian Photography that toured through Barcelona and Vitoria-Gasteiz, Spain in 2010. Art historian Deepak Ananth described Singh's series Wake Me Up When I Am Dead as being "radical and subversive... Ebenezer's self-portraits reveal a complex iconography, unafraid of their political undertones and repercussions." Singh's video art pieces, such as Master of Arts and Narashimha Avatar, have been included in short film festivals and exhibitions. Austin Peay State University in Tennessee showcased Singh's videos in its annual Terminal Short Video Festival in 2011.

In an exhibition titled Radiate: Art of the South Asian Diaspora, Singh's sculptures and visual works were exhibited at Gallery 400 in the University of Illinois at Chicago and at the Windsor Art Center in Connecticut. Singh's collaborations include a 2014 exhibition titled When Marco Polo Saw Elephants, a show reviewed by art critic Susan Dunne of the Hartford Courant.  Singh is currently represented by the R L Fine Arts Gallery in New York City.

Work
Singh's works are often described as metaphysical explications on memory, mythology and symbolic iconography. Indian art critic Nancy Adajania describes Singh's work, saying, "Ebenezer uses his own body as a measure of his expression, allowing it to soar only to be grounded by its reflection: embracing a cosmic totality only to be cut by the swirling swathe of death...it liberates him from the distractions of excessive visual stimuli, to concentrate on the live material of the body that burns a thirsty flaming yellow, turns green with lust and envy and blue with spiritual awaking."

Art critic and Director and Chief Curator of the Kiran Nadar Museum of Art, Roobina Karode says that he "consistently draws on themes such as redemption, betrayal, guilt, wanderlust and male valor," and that the artist "channels his spontaneity on canvas and sculpture... and exposes preconceived notions on the 'superhuman' ideal of male virility and societal masculinity."
Writing about Singh's charcoal drawings and fiberglass sculptures in a solo exhibition titled Thus Spake Zarathustra she said, "Ebenezer’s drawings are intensely evocative with their charged malleability... [and he] masters the controlled messiness of the medium for its raw appeal and expressivity."

Selected solo exhibitions
Holy Smoke and Other Works, R L Fine Arts, New York, USA - 2010
Thus Spake Zarathustra, Pundole Art Gallery, Mumbai, India - 2008
Ebenezer-A Decade-Works 1997 – 2007, Galerie Muller & Plate, Munich, Germany - 2007
Sharing the Planet, Pundole Art Gallery,  Mumbai, India - 2007
White Nights, Palette Art Gallery, New Delhi, India – 2006
Ebenezer - Recent Works, Pundole Art Gallery, Mumbai, India - 2005
Blind Man’s Profession, Anant Art Gallery, New Delhi, India - 2005
Neti...Neti, Kingston University, Surrey, UK - 1999

Selected group exhibitions

Museum exhibitions
Self and the Other – Portraiture in Contemporary Indian Photography – Curators Devika Daulet-Singh & Luisa Ortinez - La Virreina Centre De la Imatge Palau de la Virreina, Barcelona, Spain. ARTIUM –Centro-Museo Vascode Arte Contemporanea, Vitoria, Gasteiz, Spain - 2009 (July) to 2010 (February)
Hybrid Trend - Contemporary Art, India & Korea, Hangaram Art Museum, Seoul, Korea – 2006
Recent Museum Acquisitions, National Gallery of Modern Art, New Delhi, India – 2006
Inspirationen – Museum fur Asiatic Kunst, Berlin, Germany - 2001(Sep) to 2002(Feb)

Group exhibitions
When Marco Polo Saw Elephants, Art and Aesthetic Gallery, New Delhi, India - 2015. Five Points Gallery, Torrington, CT, USA - 2014
Radiate, Windsor Art Center, CT. Gallery 400, University of Illinois at Chicago, IL, USA - 2012
Video Wednesday – II, Curator Gayatri Sinha & Critical Collective, Gallery Espace, New Delhi, India - 2012
Terminal Short Video Festival, Austin Peay State University, Tennessee, USA - 2011
End to End, Harvestworks Digital Media Arts Centre, New York, USA - 2011
The Intuitive-Logic Revisited, Osian’s & World Economic Forum, Davos-Klosters, Switzerland - 2011 
Myself – A Survey of Contemporary Self-Portraiture, Sheppard Fine Arts Gallery, Reno, Nevada, USA - 2011
Video India, Videospace, Budapest, Hungary - 2010
Marvelous Reality, Gallery Espace, New Delhi, India - 2009
The Art of India – 20 years of Contemporary Indian Art, Indien-Institut, Galerie Muller & Plate, Munich, Germany - 2009
Human Figure, Curator Marta Jakimowicz Karle, Gallery Threshold, New Delhi, India - 2006
Are we like this only, Vadehra Art Gallery, New Delhi, India - 2005

References

External links 

1967 births
Lesley University alumni
Living people
Artists from Tamil Nadu
People from Tirunelveli
Neo-expressionist artists